John Howard Letsinger (November 17, 1911 – January 31, 2002) was an American football center who played one season with the Pittsburgh Pirates of the National Football League. He played college football at Purdue University and attended Bloomfield High School in Bloomfield, Indiana. Several sources give his nickname as "Jim".

College career
Letsinger played for the Purdue Boilermakers from 1931 to 1932, earning Associated Press Second-team All-Big Ten honors in 1932.

Professional career
Letsinger played in one game for the Pittsburgh Pirates during the 1933 season.

References

External links
Just Sports Stats

1911 births
2002 deaths
Players of American football from Indiana
American football guards
Purdue Boilermakers football players
Pittsburgh Pirates (football) players
People from Greene County, Indiana
People from Bloomfield, Indiana